NGC 9 is a spiral galaxy about 140 million light-years away in the Pegasus constellation. It was discovered on 27 September 1865 by Otto Wilhelm von Struve.

References

External links
 
 

Galaxies discovered in 1865
Unbarred spiral galaxies
0009
00078
00652
18650927
Discoveries by Otto Struve
Pegasus (constellation)